Kundura or Kundra is an administrative block in Jeypore subdivision in Koraput district in the Indian state of Odisha.

References

Koraput district